Sepiddasht may refer to:

 Sepiddasht Rural District, a rural district in Papi District, Khorramabad County, Lorestan Province, Iran
 Sepiddasht, Lorestan, a city in and capital of Papi District, Khorramabad County, Lorestan Province, Iran
 Sepiddasht, Alborz, a village in Fardis Rural District, in the Central District of Fardis County, Alborz Province, Iran